Franco Junior Aliberti Barreto  (born on 16 June 1984 in Montevideo) is a Uruguayan footballer (striker) who plays for Patriotas of Colombia.

Profile
Junior Aliberti started his career in 2002 playing for Danubio. He stayed there until 2004 when he was loaned out mid-year to Deportivo Maldonado. He returned to Danubio the following year where he played in the Copa Libertadores, he was than transferred to Plaza Colonia during the middle of 2005. 

In 2006, he went to Montevideo Wanderers and in August of that same year he went to Miramar Misiones. 

In 2007, he went to C.A. Bella Vista and was than transferred to C.A. Progreso where he stayed until July 2008. He then went to Club Atlético Cerro. He transferred to Sporting Cristal in January 2009.

References

1977 births
Living people
Footballers from Montevideo
Uruguayan footballers
Association football forwards
Uruguayan Primera División players
Danubio F.C. players
Deportivo Maldonado players
Plaza Colonia players
Montevideo Wanderers F.C. players
Miramar Misiones players
C.A. Bella Vista players
C.A. Progreso players
C.A. Cerro players
Sporting Cristal footballers
Deportivo Pasto footballers
El Tanque Sisley players
L.D.U. Loja footballers
José Gálvez FBC footballers
Patriotas Boyacá footballers
Uruguayan expatriate footballers
Expatriate footballers in Peru
Expatriate footballers in Ecuador
Expatriate footballers in Colombia